Githabul, also known as Galibal, Dinggabal, and Condamine – Upper Clarence Bandjalang, is an Australian Aboriginal language spoken by the Githabul living in South Queensland and North-East New South Wales.

Nomenclature 

In the Githabul language, the word  means 'those who say ';  means 'that's right' and is a common exonym and endonym for the people and their language.

 specifically refers to the language as spoken around Woodenbong, while the southern variety spoken near Drake was known as Dingabal which means 'those who say ', with  meaning 'that's right'.

The eastern variety spoken near Kyogle on the Richmond river used the term  which meant 'those who say ';  means 'this' and contrasts with Githabul and Dinggabal which used .

Grammar

Verb morphology 
Verbs are conjugated with the use of suffixes. It is an aspect-dominant language, as opposed to tense-dominant like English. Githabul suffixes mostly conjugate for aspect and mood.

Suffixes 
Verb suffixes are placed in six orders. A verb may not take more than one suffix from an order, and similar to nouns, suffixes are attached in a set order. Combinations of these suffixes express all possible conjugations of Githabul verbs, with only a small number of combinations possible. Githabul verb stems are commonly two syllables in length and always end in a vowel.

Adjective Morphology 
Adjectives can be marked with a suffix to indicate the gender of the noun they qualify. Githabul has one of the most extensive gender systems of all the Bandjalangic languages.

Suffixes 

*N stands for a homorganic nasal.

Demonstratives 
Githabul possesses a complicated set of demonstratives that make a three-way distinction, with proximal, medial, and distal sets. There is a further distinguishing of demonstrative adjectives and location demonstratives. The adjective set can be additionally suffixed to create demonstrative pronouns. The adjective set has three forms for "things in sight", "things hidden or not in sight" and "things not there anymore", while the location set has forms to indicate the general area and definite area, whether in sight or not in sight, and past and present forms.

Adjective set 

 The Galibal dialect uses the forms Gali, Mali and Gili.
The above set can be suffixed with order 7 noun suffixes to form demonstrative pronouns that function like ordinary independent nouns. e.g.  'Take this with you!

The 'not in sight' and 'not here anymore' forms can take the order 2 noun suffix -gan to form time words. E.g  'recently'.

Location set

References 

Yugambeh–Bundjalung languages